George McClellan Bourquin (June 24, 1863 – November 15, 1958) was a United States district judge of the United States District Court for the District of Montana.

Education and career

Born in Warren County, Pennsylvania, Bourquin read law to enter the bar in 1894. He was in private practice in Helena, Montana from 1894 to 1899, and then in private practice in Butte, Montana until 1904. He was a district court judge for Silver Bow County, Montana from 1905 to 1909, returning to private practice in Butte until 1912.

Federal judicial service

On February 13, 1912, Bourquin was nominated by President William Howard Taft to a seat on the United States District Court for the District of Montana vacated by Judge Carl L. Rasch. Bourquin was confirmed by the United States Senate on March 8, 1912, and received his commission the same day. He assumed senior status on March 9, 1934, serving in that capacity until his death on November 15, 1958.

References

Sources
 

1863 births
1958 deaths
Judges of the United States District Court for the District of Montana
United States district court judges appointed by William Howard Taft
20th-century American judges
United States federal judges admitted to the practice of law by reading law